"Antiseptic Principle of the Practice of Surgery" is a paper regarding antiseptics written by Joseph Lister in 1867.

External links 
 Antiseptic Principle of the Practice of Surgery
 
 1909 reprint in a compilation on Google Books, in public domain in the US
 1967 British Medical Journal reprint PDF hosted by NIH

Antiseptics
1867 essays
1867 in science
Biology papers